Carabus albrechti tohokuensis is a subspecies of ground beetle in the family Carabidae that is endemic to Japan.

References

albrechti tohokuensis
Beetles described in 1984
Endemic fauna of Japan